Shifter may refer to:

Technology 
 Gear stick, known in US English as "shifter", the lever of a manual or automatic automobile or truck transmission
 Shifter (bicycle part), or gear lever, a bicycle part that selects which gear the chain rests on
 Shifter (tool), an adjustable wrench/spanner
 A switcher in the terminology of the Pennsylvania Railroad
 Barrel shifter, part of a computer processor that performs bit shifts

Fiction 
 A shapeshifting character in science fiction, fantasy fiction, and role-playing games
 Shifter (Justice League Unlimited),  a former superhero featured in the animated television series
 Shifter (Dungeons & Dragons), a prestige class in the role-playing game
 Shifter (Eberron), a race in the Eberron campaign setting of the Dungeons & Dragons role-playing game
 Jenny Everywhere, aka The Shifter, open source webcomic character
 Shiphtur, pseudonym of Danny Le, Canadian League of Legends player

See also 
 Shift (disambiguation)